The  doubles competition of the 2007 Heineken Open tennis tournament was held on outdoor hard courts at the ASB Tennis Centre in Auckland, New Zealand between 8-15 January 2007. Andrei Pavel and Rogier Wassen were the defending champions, but Pavel did not participate this year.

Jeff Coetzee and Wassen won in the final 6–7(9–11), 6–3, [10–2], against Simon Aspelin and Chris Haggard.

Seeds

Draw

Draw

External links
Draw

Doubles